The 2016 Naturtex Women's Open was a professional tennis tournament played on outdoor clay courts. It was the first edition of the tournament and part of the 2016 ITF Women's Circuit, offering a total of $50,000 in prize money. It took place in Szeged, Hungary, on 13–19 June 2016.

Singles main draw entrants

Seeds 

 1 Rankings as of 6 June 2016.

Other entrants 
The following player received a wildcard into the singles main draw:
  Bianka Békefi
  Ágnes Bukta
  Rebeka Stolmár
  Naomi Totka

The following players received entry from the qualifying draw:
  Ema Burgić Bucko
  Cristina Ene
  Marina Kachar
  Dejana Radanović 

The following player received entry by a lucky loser spot:
  Gabriela Duca

Champions

Singles

 Viktoriya Tomova def.  Maria Sakkari, 4–6, 6–0, 6–4

Doubles

 Cristina Dinu /  Lina Gjorcheska def.  Justyna Jegiołka /  Guadalupe Pérez Rojas, 4–6, 6–1, [10–4]

External links 
 2016 Naturtex Women's Open at ITFtennis.com

2016 ITF Women's Circuit
2016 in Hungarian women's sport
Tennis tournaments in Hungary
2016 in Hungarian tennis